Cássio Francisco de Jesus (born 21 November 1989) is a Brazilian professional footballer who plays as a centre back and is currently a free agent.

Cássio has been included by FourFourTwo Indonesia in Best XI of Liga 1 July 2017. He is regarded as one of the best central defenders in Indonesian Liga 1.

Club career

Semen Padang
In April 2016, Cássio signed a contract with Indonesian side Semen Padang and played for 2016 and 2017 season. Cássio has made over 60 appearances over two seasons playing for the club.

Kelantan
On 3 December 2017, Cássio signed a one-year contract with an option for another year with Malaysian side Kelantan. On 3 February 2018, Cássio made his league debut for Kelantan in 2–1 defeat to Melaka United at Hang Jebat Stadium.

Rangers
On 17 August 2022, Cássio joined Hong Kong Premier League club Rangers.

Career statistics

Club

Honours

Club
Guarani
Série B: Runner-up 2009

References

External links

1989 births
Living people
Brazilian footballers
Brazilian expatriate footballers
Campeonato Brasileiro Série A players
Campeonato Catarinense players
Guarani FC players
Mogi Mirim Esporte Clube players
São Carlos Futebol Clube players
Tombense Futebol Clube players
Esporte Clube Mamoré players
Associação Atlética Flamengo players
Araxá Esporte Clube players
Liga 1 (Indonesia) players
Malaysia Super League players
Hong Kong Premier League players
Semen Padang F.C. players
Kelantan FA players
PS Barito Putera players
Hong Kong Rangers FC players
Expatriate footballers in Indonesia
Expatriate footballers in Malaysia
Expatriate footballers in Hong Kong
Brazilian expatriate sportspeople in Indonesia
Brazilian expatriate sportspeople in Malaysia
Brazilian expatriate sportspeople in Hong Kong
Footballers from São Paulo
Association football defenders